Buvik Idrettslag is a multi-sports team from Buvik in Skaun, Norway. In 2012, the club's first football team played in the Second Division, having won their Third Division conference in 2011. The team was, however, relegated after only one season in the Second Division. They play their home games at Buvik Stadion.

Recent history 
{|class="wikitable"
|-bgcolor="#efefef"
! Season
! 
! Pos.
! Pl.
! W
! D
! L
! GS
! GA
! P
!Cup
!Notes
|-
|2009
|3. divisjon
|align=right |7
|align=right|22||align=right|9||align=right|5||align=right|8
|align=right|69||align=right|47||align=right|32
||First qualifying round
|
|-
|2010
|3. divisjon
|align=right |2
|align=right|22||align=right|15||align=right|1||align=right|6
|align=right|83||align=right|45||align=right|46
||First qualifying round
|
|-
|2011
|3. divisjon
|align=right bgcolor=#DDFFDD| 1
|align=right|26||align=right|20||align=right|0||align=right|6
|align=right|88||align=right|48||align=right|60
||Second qualifying round
|Promoted to the 2. divisjon
|-
|2012 
|2. divisjon
|align=right bgcolor="#FFCCCC"| 13
|align=right|26||align=right|4||align=right|4||align=right|18
|align=right|41||align=right|88||align=right|16
||First round
|Relegated to the 3. divisjon
|-
|2013
|3. divisjon
|align=right |4
|align=right|26||align=right|14||align=right|5||align=right|7
|align=right|78||align=right|48||align=right|47
|First round
|
|}

References

Football clubs in Norway
Skaun
1901 establishments in Norway
Association football clubs established in 1901